Dost TV is a privately held thematic TV channel in Turkey and airs mainly religious programs. It was established in Ankara in 2005. 'Dost' means 'friend' in Turkish.

External links
Official Site 
Dost TV Live
Dost TV at LyngSat Address

24-hour television news channels in Turkey
Television stations in Turkey
Turkish-language television stations
Mass media in Ankara
Religious television stations in Turkey